Komsomolsky is a rural locality (a settlement) and the administrative center of Komsomolskoye Rural Settlement, Belgorodsky District, Belgorod Oblast, Russia. Population:  There are 78 streets.

Geography 
Komsomolsky is located 9 km north of Maysky (the district's administrative centre) by road. Streletskoye 72 is the nearest rural locality.

References 

Rural localities in Belgorodsky District